Xenicomorpha is a genus of beetle belonging to the  leaf beetle family, Chrysomelidae, containing a single species, X. scapularis. Both the larvae and the adults (imago) are herbivores.

Description 
A middle-sized, oval, brown-gold (at least on dead examples) tortoise beetle. The front corner covers are not prominent. The head is visible from above, the antennae about the same length as the pronotums. The pronotum is rounded trapezoidal, somewhat narrower than the cover wings, not forming a continuous curve with them. The covers are pointed at the back, the surface fine but tight and heavily punctured. The legs are fairly short.

Ecology 
The species lives on plants from the family Convolvulaceae.

Distribution 

The species is known from Peru and Bolivia.

References

External links 
 University of Wroclaw - Cassidinae of the world

Cassidinae
Beetles described in 1854
Monotypic Chrysomelidae genera
Fauna of Peru
Fauna of Bolivia
Beetles of South America